Mahony may refer to :

Bertha Mahony (1882–1969), children’s literature publisher
Chris Mahony (born 1981) New Zealand rugby union player
Dennis Mahony (1821–1879), Irish-American journalist and politician
Eoghan Mahony, American television writer and producer
Francis Sylvester Mahony (1804–1866), also known as Father Prout, Irish humorist
Frank Mahony (public servant) (1915–2000), Australian public servant and Director-General of Security
Frank P. Mahony (1862–1916), Australian artist and member of the Dawn and Dusk Club
Harold Mahony (1867–1905), Irish tennis player
Jerry Mahony (born 1956), British auto racing driver
John Keefer Mahony (1911-1990), Canadian recipient of the Victoria Cross
Junior Mahony (1897–1973), Irish hurler
Leo Halpin Mahony (born 1931), American architect
Louise Mahony, Irish camogie player
Marion Mahony Griffin (1871–1961), American architect and artist
Pauric Mahony (born 1992), Irish hurler
Philip Mahony (politician) (1897–1972), Irish politician
Philip Mahony (hurler) (born 1991), Irish hurler
Roger Mahony (born 1936), American cardinal of the Roman Catholic Church
Tom Mahony, Irish hurler
William Mahony (disambiguation)

See also
Mahoney
O'Mahony